Phosphogypsum (PG) is the calcium sulfate hydrate formed as a by-product of the production of fertilizer from phosphate rock. It is mainly composed of gypsum (CaSO4·2H2O). Although gypsum is a widely used material in the construction industry, phosphogypsum is usually not used, but is stored indefinitely because of its weak radioactivity caused by the presence of naturally occurring uranium (U) and thorium (Th), and their daughter isotopes radium (Ra), radon (Rn) and polonium (Po). The long-range storage of phosphogypsum is controversial. About five tons of phosphogypsum are generated per ton of phosphoric acid production. Annually, the estimated generation of phosphogypsum worldwide is  100 to 280 million metric tons.

Production and properties 
Phosphogypsum is a by-product from the production of phosphoric acid by treating phosphate ore (apatite) with sulfuric acid according to the following reaction:
Ca5(PO4)3X + 5 H2SO4 + 10 H2O → 3 H3PO4 + 5 (CaSO4 · 2 H2O) + HX
where X may include OH, F, Cl, or Br

Phosphogypsum is radioactive due to the presence of naturally occurring uranium (5–10 ppm) and thorium, and their daughter nuclides radium, radon, polonium, etc. Marine-deposited phosphate typically has a higher level of radioactivity than igneous phosphate deposits, because uranium is present in seawater at about 3 ppb (roughly 85 ppb of total dissolved solids). Uranium is concentrated during the formation of evaporite deposits as dissolved solids precipitate in order of solubility with easily dissolved materials such as sodium chloride remaining in solution longer than less soluble materials like uranium or sulfates. Other components of phosphogypsum include silica (5–10%), fluoride (F, ~1%), phosphorus (P, ~0.5%), iron (Fe, ~0.1%), aluminum (Al, ~0.1%), barium (Ba, 50 ppm), lead (Pb, ~5 ppm), chromium (Cr, ~3 ppm), selenium (Se, ~1 ppm), cadmium (Cd, ~0.3 ppm). About 90% of Po and Ra from raw ore is retained into Phosphogypsum. Thus it can be considered technologically enhanced naturally occurring radioactive material (TENORM).

Use 
Various applications have been proposed for using phosphogypsum, including using it as material for:
Artificial reefs and oyster beds
Cover for landfills
Road pavement
Roof tiles
Soil conditioner

According to Taylor (2009), "up to 15% of world PG production is used to make building materials, as a soil amendment and as a set controller in the manufacture of Portland cement". The rest remains in stack.

In the United States

The United States Environmental Protection Agency (EPA) has banned most applications of phosphogypsum having a 226Ra concentration of greater than 10 picocurie/gram (0.4 Bq/g) in 1990. As a result, phosphogypsum which exceeds this limit is stored in large stacks since extracting such low concentrations of radium is either not possible or not economical with current technology for either the use of the gypsum or the radium .

EPA approved the use of phosphogypsum for road construction in 2020, saying that the approval came at the request of The Fertilizer Institute, which advocates for the fertilizer industry. Environmentalists opposed the decision, saying that using the radioactive material in this way can pose health risks. In 2021, the EPA withdrew the rule authorizing the use of phosphogypsum in road construction. Which - if any - health risks are associated with the low doses of radiation that may result from the use of phosphogypsum in construction is hard to quantify as natural background radiation usually imparts a higher dose than those additional sources. Policy is based on the linear no threshold model and thus usually mandates to keep any avoidable dose as low as reasonably achievable. Given that the involved radionuclides are alpha emitters, whose main danger comes from incorporation (inhalation, ingestion etc.), an unsuitably stacked deposit which emits dust to the environment may actually impart a higher absorbed dose than durable construction materials that do not release dust to the environment.

In China 
China's phosphate fertilizer production exceeded that of the US in 2005, and with it came the problem of excess phosphogypsum. By 2018, inappropriate storage has become a major problem in the Yangtze River watershed, with phosphorus accounting for 56% of all breaches of water quality standards. Phosphorus, which still remains in phosphogypsum, can lead to eutrophication of bodies of water and hence algal blooms or even anoxic events ("dead zones") in the lower layers of a body of water. The total amount of phosphogypsum in storage by 2020 exceeds 600 Mt, with 75 Mt produced each year.

The construction industry is the number one user of phosphogypsum in 2020, with 10.5 Mt used as concrete set retarder and 3.5 Mt used in drywall. It is also used as a chemical feedstock for producing sulfates, and as a soil conditioner similar to regular gypsum. The total consumption in 2020 was 31 Mt, much lower than the rate of accumulation. There has been a significant push to expand the use of phosphogypsum on the national level since 2016, being part of two consecutive five-year plans.

Phosphogypsum may require pre-processing to remove contaminants before use. Phosphorus (P) significantly retards curing and reduces the strength of the material, an important concern in construction. Fluorine (F) may accumulate in crops. Although Chinese phosphogypsum generally contain less toxic heavy metals and radioactive elements  , some nevertheless exceed acceptable radioactivity limits for building material, or produce crops with unacceptable amounts of arsenic (As), lead (Pb), cadmium (Cd), or mercury (Hg). Barriers to further use include cost of heavy metal removal and considerable variation among sources of phosphogypsum.

Pollution and cleanup 

Phosphogypsum may pollute the environment by its phosphorus content causing eutrophication, by its toxic heavy metal content, and by its radioactivity. PG releases radon, which can accumulate indoors if used as a construction material. Open-air stores also release radon at a level potentially hazardous to workers. Radon is a noble gas that is heavier than air and thus tends to accumulate in poorly ventilated underground spaces like mines or cellars. Naturally occurring radon is considered the second most common cause of lung cancer after smoking. More substantial however is the leaching of the contents of phosphogypsum into the water table and consequently soil, exacerbated by the fact that PG is often transported as a slurry. Accumulation of water inside of gypstacks can lead to weakening of the stack structure, a cause of several alarms in the United States.

The main approach to reducing PG pollution is to act before it leaches into the environment. This can mean recycling purified materials from PG in a variety of applications (see above) or converting it into a more stable form for storage. Cement paste backfill converts hazardous mining waste, such as PG, into a cement paste, and then uses the paste to fill in voids created by mining the rocks.

Bioremediation may be used to clean up already contaminated water and soil. Microbials can remove heavy metals and radioactive material [citation needed regarding radioactivity removal by plants], any organic pollutants within, and reduce the sulfate material. With suitable soil amendments and additives, PG can also support the growth of hardy plants, hopefully preventing further erosion.

Gyp stacks 
Often phosphogypsum reuse is uneconomical due to impurities, mining companies commonly dump the waste into man-made hills called "phosphogypsum stacks"  or waste ponds near the mine. Waste ponds are open-air reservoirs that contain a variety of different types of industrial and agricultural waste. including at least 70 phosphogypsum stacks (from phosphate mines used for fertilizer production). A leaking phosphogypsum waste pond that nearly collapsed if waste wasn't allowed to flow into Tampa Bay in Florida in 2021 highlights the dangers and near-disasters associated with wastewater ponds throughout the country.

Central Florida has a large quantity of phosphate deposits, particularly in the Bone Valley region. The marine-deposited phosphate ore from central Florida is weakly radioactive, and as such, the phosphogypsum by-product (in which the radionuclides are somewhat concentrated) is too radioactive to be used for most applications. As a result, there are about a billion tons of phosphogypsum stacked in 25 stacks in Florida (22 are in central Florida) and about 30 million additional tons are generated each year.

See also 
 
 Red mud - highly alkaline waste product from aluminum processing
 Mine tailings - general issue of waste products left after mining
 Acid mine drainage - highly acidic waters produced from interactions between water oxygen and sulfur compounds deposited under reducing conditions

References

Further reading
 

Radioactive waste
Sulfates